Hemington is a village and civil parish in North Northamptonshire, England. The parish population (including the neighbouring small parishes of Luddington-in-the-Brook and Thurning) at the 2011 Census was 257.

The village's name means 'estate associated with a man called Hemma or Hemmi'. Other sources suggest the specific may be Old English hemming, meaning a border or an enclosure.

References

External links

Villages in Northamptonshire
Civil parishes in Northamptonshire
North Northamptonshire